Jimi Hendrix (1942–1970) was an American musician who recorded over 170 different songs during his career from 1966 to 1970. Often considered one of the most accomplished and influential electric guitarists, Hendrix wrote most of his own material in a variety of styles.  Some show his blues and R&B roots and others incorporate jazz and early funk influences. Some songs, such as "Purple Haze", "Voodoo Child (Slight Return)", and "Machine Gun", feature his guitar-dominated hard and psychedelic rock sound, while others including "The Wind Cries Mary" and "Little Wing" take a slower, more melodic approach. Two of his best-known single releases were written by others: "Hey Joe" by Billy Roberts and "All Along the Watchtower" by Bob Dylan. Hendrix supplied his own interpretations, however, which gave them a much different character than the originals. 

Hendrix was known for his live performances. While he often played the numbers from his studio albums, several released songs exist only in live recordings. His radical interpretation of "The Star-Spangled Banner", which he performed at the 1969 Woodstock music festival, was a highlight of the event's 1970 documentary film, becoming "part of the sixties Zeitgeist."  The live "Machine Gun" is often lauded as Hendrix's greatest achievement, in which he used the guitar to create sounds of a battlefield and noises similar to explosions, bombs dropping, and machine guns.  Other songs only performed in concert show his interest in different styles of music. These include interpretations of blues songs by artists such as Howlin' Wolf ("Killing Floor"), B.B. King ("Rock Me Baby"), and Muddy Waters ("Catfish Blues"); the early rock and roll numbers "Johnny B. Goode" and "Blue Suede Shoes"; as well as the more contemporary rock "Sunshine of Your Love" and "Dear Mr. Fantasy".

At the time of his death, Hendrix was writing and recording for a planned fourth studio album. Songs such as "Freedom" and "Hey Baby (New Rising Sun)" signaled a new direction in Hendrix's music, which included a more integrated mix of hard rock with elements of R&B and multiple guitar parts. He also left behind a large number of partially completed songs, demos, and jams in a variety of styles, which continue to be issued.  Although he toured and mostly recorded as a three-piece, several Hendrix songs featured additional musicians, such as background vocalists, percussionists, and keyboardists.  The long studio jam "Voodoo Chile", which Hendrix developed into "Voodoo Child (Slight Return)", was recorded with organist Steve Winwood and bassist Jack Casady. Jamming was integral to his songwriting process and several posthumous post-1980 albums contain songs that are largely studio jams with various players. How much of this material Hendrix would have completed or released is unknown, but nonetheless has become part of his recording legacy.

In his writings, performances, and in the recording studio, Hendrix often referred to songs using alternate titles.  Record companies in the US and UK sometimes issued his songs with differences in the spelling; Track Records (UK) used "Foxy Lady", while Reprise Records (US) spelled it "Foxey Lady". Later album producers changed some titles or supplied their own, when a formal name had not been identified.

Main songs (1966–1970)
Sixty songs were issued during Hendrix's lifetime, principally on the first three studio albums, a compilation, and a split live album under the Jimi Hendrix Experience name:
Are You Experienced (1967)
Axis: Bold as Love (1967)
Smash Hits (1968)
Electric Ladyland (1968)
Historic Performances Recorded at the Monterey International Pop Festival (1970)
Additional songs recorded live were issued on Band of Gypsys (1970) and the various artists release Woodstock: Music from the Original Soundtrack and More (1970). Two songs recorded with the Band of Gypsys lineup were issued as a single in 1970.

{| class="wikitable sortable plainrowheaders" style="text-align:center;"
|+List of songs with title, songwriter(s), original album release, year of release, and reference(s)
! scope="col" width=42% |Original title
! scope="col" width=20% |Writer(s)
! scope="col" width=28% |Original albumrelease
! scope="col" width=5% |Year
! scope="col"  width=5% class="unsortable"|
|-
! scope="row" |  "3rd Stone from the Sun"
| 
| Are You Experienced
| 1967
| 
|-
! scope="row" style="background-color:#CCFFFF" | "51st Anniversary"
| Hendrix
| Smash Hits(UK edition)
| 1967
| 
|-
! scope="row" | "1983... (A Merman I Should Turn to Be)"
| Hendrix
| Electric Ladyland
| 1968
| 
|-
! scope="row" |  "Ain't No Telling"
| Hendrix
| Axis: Bold as Love
| 1967
| 
|-
! scope="row" style="background-color:#CCFFFF"| "All Along the Watchtower"
| 
| Electric Ladyland
| 1968
| 
|-
! scope="row" | ""
| Hendrix
| Electric Ladyland
| 1968
| 
|-
! scope="row" | "Are You Experienced?"
| Hendrix
| Are You Experienced
| 1967
| 
|-
! scope="row" |  "Bold as Love"
| Hendrix
| Axis: Bold as Love
| 1967
| 
|-
! scope="row" style="background-color:#CCFFFF"| "Burning of the Midnight Lamp"
| Hendrix
| Smash Hits(UK edition)
| 1967
| 
|-
! scope="row" |  "Can You See Me"
| Hendrix
| Are You Experienced(UK edition)
| 1967
| 
|-
! scope="row" | "Castles Made of Sand"
| Hendrix
| Axis: Bold as Love
| 1967
| 
|-
! scope="row" style="background-color:#BFFFC0" | "Changes"
| 
| Band of Gypsys
| 1970
| 
|-
! scope="row" | "Come On (Part I)"
| 
| Electric Ladyland
| 1968
| 
|-
! scope="row" style="background-color:#CCFFFF" | "Crosstown Traffic"
| Hendrix
| Electric Ladyland
| 1968
| 
|-
! scope="row" |  "Electric Ladyland"
 see "Have You Ever Been (To Electric Ladyland)"
| 
| 
| 
| 
|-
! scope="row" | "EXP"
| Hendrix
| Axis: Bold as Love
| 1967
| 
|-
! scope="row" style="background-color:#CCFFFF" |   "Fire"
| Hendrix
| Are You Experienced
| 1967
| 
|-
! scope="row" style="background-color:#CCFFFF"| "Foxy Lady"
| Hendrix
| Are You Experienced
| 1967
| 
|-
! scope="row" style="background-color:#CCFFFF" |  "Gypsy Eyes"
| Hendrix
| Electric Ladyland
| 1968
| 
|-
! scope="row" |  "Have You Ever Been (To Electric Ladyland)"
| Hendrix
| Electric Ladyland
| 1968
| 
|-
! scope="row" style="background-color:#CCFFFF"| "Hey Joe"
| 
| Are You Experienced(US edition)
| 1966
| 
|-
! scope="row" style="background-color:#CCFFFF"| "Highway Chile"
| Hendrix
| Smash Hits(UK edition)
| 1967
| 
|-
! scope="row" | "House Burning Down"
| Hendrix
| Electric Ladyland
| 1968
| 
|-
! scope="row" |  "I Don't Live Today"
| Hendrix
| Are You Experienced
| 1967
| 
|-
! scope="row" style="background-color:#CCFFFF" | "If Six Was Nine"
| Hendrix
| Axis: Bold as Love
| 1967
| 
|-
! scope="row" | "Instrumental Solo"
 see "Villanova Junction"
| 
| 
| 
| 
|-
! scope="row" style="background-color:#CCFFFF"| "Izabella"
| Hendrix
| War Heroes
| 1970
| 
|-
! scope="row" style="background-color:#BFFFC0"|  "Like a Rolling Stone"
| 
| Historic Performances
| 1970
| 
|-
! scope="row" | "Little Miss Lover"
| Hendrix
| Axis: Bold as Love
| 1967
| 
|-
! scope="row" | "Little Miss Strange"
| 
| Electric Ladyland
| 1968
| 
|-
! scope="row" | "Little Wing"
| Hendrix
| Axis: Bold as Love
| 1967
| 
|-
! scope="row" style="background-color:#CCFFFF" |"Long Hot Summer Night"
| Hendrix
| Electric Ladyland
| 1968
| 
|-
! scope="row" | "Love or Confusion"
| Hendrix
| Are You Experienced
| 1967
| 
|-
! scope="row" style="background-color:#BFFFC0" |  "Machine Gun"
| Hendrix
| Band of Gypsys
| 1970
| 
|-
! scope="row" | "Manic Depression"
| Hendrix
| Are You Experienced
| 1967
| 
|-
! scope="row"  | "May This Be Love"
| Hendrix
| Are You Experienced
| 1967
| 
|-
! scope="row" style="background-color:#BFFFC0"| "Message of Love"{{efn|The original Capitol Band of Gypsys album listed the song title as "Message of Love".  However, Track (UK), Barclay (France), and others used "Message to Love". A different take titled "Message to the Universe" was included on South Saturn Delta".}}
| Hendrix
| Band of Gypsys| 1970
| 
|-
! scope="row" | "Moon, Turn the Tides...Gently Gently Away"
| Hendrix
| Electric Ladyland| 1968
| 
|-
! scope="row" style="background-color:#CCFFFF" |  "One Rainy Wish"
| Hendrix
| Axis: Bold as Love| 1967
| 
|-
! scope="row" style="background-color:#BFFFC0"|  "Power to Love"
| Hendrix
| Band of Gypsys| 1970
| 
|-
! scope="row" style="background-color:#CCFFFF"| "Purple Haze"
| Hendrix
| Are You Experienced(US edition)
| 1967
| 
|-
! scope="row" |  "Rainy Day, Dream Away"
| Hendrix
| Electric Ladyland| 1968
| 
|-
! scope="row" | "Red House"
| Hendrix
| Are You Experienced(UK edition)
| 1967
| 
|-
! scope="row" | "Remember"
| Hendrix
| Are You Experienced(UK edition)
| 1967
| 
|-
! scope="row" style="background-color:#BFFFC0"| "Rock Me Baby"
| 
| Historic Performances| 1970
| 
|-
! scope="row" |  "She's So Fine"
| 
| Axis: Bold as Love| 1967
| 
|-
! scope="row" | "Spanish Castle Magic"
| Hendrix
| Axis: Bold as Love| 1967
| 
|-
! scope="row" style="background-color:#BFFFC0" | "Star Spangled Banner"
|Traditional ( by Hendrix)
| Woodstock: Music from the Original Soundtrack and More| 1970
| 
|-
! scope="row" style="background-color:#CCFFFF"| ""
| Hendrix
| Smash Hits(UK edition)
| 1967
| 
|-
! scope="row" style="background-color:#CCFFFF"| "Stepping Stone"
| Hendrix
| War Heroes| 1970
| 
|-
! scope="row"| "Still Raining, Still Dreaming"
| Hendrix
| Electric Ladyland| 1968
| 
|-
! scope="row" style="background-color:#CCFFFF" | "Stone Free"
| Hendrix
| Smash Hits| 1966
| 
|-
! scope="row" |  "Third Stone from the Sun"
 see "3rd Stone from the Sun"
| 
| 
| 
| 
|-
! scope="row" style="background-color:#CCFFFF"|  "Up from the Skies"
| Hendrix
| Axis: Bold as Love| 1967
| 
|-
! scope="row" style="background-color:#BFFFC0"|  "Villanova Junction"
| Hendrix
| Woodstock: Music from the Original Soundtrack and More| 1970
| 
|-
! scope="row" style="background-color:#CCFFFF" | "Voodoo Child (Slight Return)"
| Hendrix
| Electric Ladyland| 1968
| 
|-
! scope="row" | "Voodoo Chile"
| Hendrix
| Electric Ladyland| 1968
| 
|-
! scope="row" |  "Wait Until Tomorrow"
| Hendrix
| Axis: Bold as Love| 1967
| 
|-
! scope="row" style="background-color:#BFFFC0" | "We Gotta Live Together"
| 
| Band of Gypsys| 1970
| 
|-
! scope="row" style="background-color:#BFFFC0"| "Who Knows"
| Hendrix
| Band of Gypsys| 1970
| 
|-
! scope="row" style="background-color:#BFFFC0"| "Wild Thing"
| 
| Historic Performances| 1970
| 
|-
! scope="row" style="background-color:#CCFFFF"| ""
| Hendrix
| Are You Experienced(US edition)
| 1967
| 
|-
! scope="row" |  "You've Got Me Floating"
| Hendrix
| Axis: Bold as Love| 1967
| 
|-
|}

Songs released posthumously (1971–present)
At the time of his death, Hendrix had a large number of songs in various stages of recording.  Some were for a planned fourth studio album; 15 songs from his proposed track listings were released on the first three posthumous Hendrix albums produced by longtime associates recording engineer Eddie Kramer and drummer Mitch Mitchell:The Cry of Love (1971)Rainbow Bridge (1971)War Heroes (1972)

Beginning in 1975, more unfinished songs were released on albums produced by Alan Douglas.  Most of the original recordings were edited and often had overdubs by musicians who had never played with Hendrix.  In 1997, Experience Hendrix, a family company, took control of his recording legacy.  Its first release, First Rays of the New Rising Sun'' (1997), combined songs from the 1971–1972 albums in the most complete attempt at presenting his unfinished fourth studio album. Experience Hendrix continues to issue additional unfinished songs, alternate takes, demos, and jams (including restored recordings from the Douglas era).  All songs listed are from official releases.

See also
Jimi Hendrix discography
Jimi Hendrix posthumous discography
Jimi Hendrix videography

Notes

References

Sources

External links

Hendrix, Jimi